The Chaste Coquette is a 1929 German silent film directed by Franz Seitz and starring Maly Delschaft,  Alfons Fryland, and Otto Gebühr. It was made at the Emelka Studios in Munich. The film's sets were designed by Ludwig Reiber.

Cast
In alphabetical order

References

Bibliography

External links

1929 films
Films of the Weimar Republic
German silent feature films
Films directed by Franz Seitz
German black-and-white films
Bavaria Film films